The 1963–64 Norwegian 1. Divisjon season was the 25th season of ice hockey in Norway. Eight teams participated in the league, and Gamlebyen won the championship.

First round

Second round

Final round

Championship tiebreaker

Relegation round

6th place
 Rosenhoff IL - Hasle-Løren Idrettslag 4:7

External links 
 Norwegian Ice Hockey Federation

Nor
GET-ligaen seasons
1963 in Norwegian sport
1964 in Norwegian sport